The YuYu Hakusho manga series features a diverse cast of fictional characters created by Yoshihiro Togashi. It follows fourteen-year-old junior high school delinquent Yusuke Urameshi, who dies and is resurrected in order to become the Underworld's detective of paranormal events in the Human World. Yusuke begins his work in the Human World, but ends up traveling to the Underworld and then eventually to the Demon Plane. In each case he undertakes, Yusuke meets several new enemies and allies. Other predominant characters include Yusuke's rival delinquent Kazuma Kuwabara, the fox demon Kurama, and the sword-wielding fire demon Hiei. While several characters are humans, many are demons, and both have different supernatural abilities due to harnessing their Reiki, one's own aura or life energy.

Creation and conception
Yoshihiro Togashi did not give much thought to the names of the characters. He came up with them by skimming through a dictionary and combining kanji characters he found appealing. The author said the name Yusuke Urameshi is "practically a joke." Viz Media explained that the "Yu" is written with the kanji for "ghost", and "Urameshiii..." is a phrase typically said by wailing ghosts.

Togashi came up with Kazuma Kuwabara's name by combining the names of two professional baseball players (Masumi Kuwata and Kazuhiro Kiyohara). Viz Media said that it is also a pun on "Kuwabara kuwabara", a phrase uttered by superstitious people when they are scared. Mari Kitayama, a lead character designer for the anime adaptation of Yu Yu Hakusho, stated that she considers Kuwabara to be the most difficult character to design.

Kurama and Hiei's names came to Togashi on the spur of the moment. When the two were introduced, the author had early plans to make Kurama a main character but was uncertain about Hiei. Togashi based Hiei's design off of the character Skunky from the manga series Patalliro! by Mineo Maya. Kitayama finds Kurama to be the easiest of the main characters to design due to his well-proportioned features and considers Hiei to be her favorite.

The names of Yusuke's school Sarayashiki and the rival Kasanegafuchi Junior High are both named after haunted mansions in famous ghost stories; Banchō Sarayashiki and Kaidan Kasanegafuchi.

The names of the characters Roto and Rinku are taken from video game characters of the same names, the former from Dragon Quest and the latter from The Legend of Zelda.

Togashi's inspiration for the character Mukuro was Kushana of Torumekia from Nausicaä of the Valley of the Wind.

After receiving a lot of letters both praising and criticizing the voice actors, Togashi clarified that he had no involvement in the anime adaptation.

Protagonists

Yusuke Urameshi

 is a fourteen-year-old delinquent who attends Sarayashiki Junior High School. His poor school attendance, constant fighting and bad habits have earned him the fear of his classmates and the disdain of his teachers and neighbors. This all changes rather abruptly when Yusuke is struck and killed by a car while saving a small child who has wandered into the road. Such an altruistic deed catches even the Underworld by surprise (referred to as the Spiritworld in English adaptations), and because they do not have a place for him yet in heaven or hell, he is permitted to return to his body and resume his life. However, while doing so it is revealed that Yusuke has a particularly strong aura, or spirit energy, and Koenma recruits him as Underworld Detective. Yusuke is charged with investigating supernatural phenomena in the Human World that have connections to the Underworld. Yusuke bears affection for his childhood friend Keiko Yukimura, who initially takes a role as Yusuke's conscience, making sure he comes to class and behaves, and later becomes his romantic interest. Yusuke's alcoholic mother, Atsuko, raised him as a single parent after conceiving him as a young teen.

At first he is only able to muster a single shot per day, but after training under Genkai he is able to fire multiple shots per day, as well as developing minor variations on the technique such as the "shotgun" variant wherein Yusuke fires a spray of miniature spirit guns at once using his fist instead of his finger. After he is killed by Shinobu Sensui, it is revealed that Yusuke is a "demon throwback"; a demon mated with a human ancestor of his 44 generations ago but the gene remained quiescent for generations. Yusuke is resurrected by his demonic powers, which when fully awakened sees his hair grow to his knees and tattoo-like marks appear on his body. Yusuke is a descendant of the demon king Raizen, whom he goes to see in the Demon Plane. Upon Raizen's death, Yusuke becomes king of his domain but proposes the Demon Plane Unification Tournament, winner taking control of the whole Demon Plane. At the end of the series, Yusuke opens up a ramen stand and also spends time helping humans and demons cooperate.

Yusuke is a popular character with fans, coming in second and third place in the series' first two popularity polls. He came in third in the American Shonen Jump poll. In the Japanese magazine Animages Anime Grand Prix popularity poll, Yusuke was ranked as the thirteenth most popular anime character in 1993, the tenth in 1994, and the eighth in 1995. In March 2010, Yusuke was ranked sixteenth best male anime character of the 1990s by the Japanese magazine Newtype.

Kazuma Kuwabara

 is a classmate of Yusuke's at Sarayashiki Junior High School. Despite his unusual affinity for kittens, he is the second toughest delinquent at the school, constantly picking fights with Yusuke to prove himself stronger, but never succeeding. Eventually Kuwabara's feelings of anger toward Yusuke become feelings of respect. Although he loves fighting, Kuwabara would never steal or extort money. Kuwabara has a very advanced sixth sense and is highly aware of the supernatural. Kuwabara ends up assisting in most of Yusuke's cases, having gained the ability to form a sword out of his own aura called the  during the competition to become Genkai's pupil. He learns to develop this power rather quickly; being able to wield two at once after training with Kurama for the Dark Tournament, and create a more powerful sword that boosts his recuperative abilities, acting as both a weapon and shield, by using the Sword of Trials he gets from Suzuki. Kuwabara later obtains the  during his fight against Kiyoshi Mitarai, a sleeker and cleaner aura sword that possesses the ability to slice and cut through and between dimensions. This causes him to become the target of Sensui as it will aid in completing the portal to the Demon Plane and he is captured, and later cuts the force field to chase after Sensui fully opening the portal.

Kuwabara falls in love at first sight of the Ice Maiden Yukina, and helps Yusuke rescue her from Gonzo Tarukane. Yukina is very appreciative to Kuwabara for saving her from captivity, but is oblivious to his affection. Towards the end of the series, Kuwabara becomes more engrossed in his studies, choosing to cram for his high school exams rather than follow Yusuke and the others into the Demon Plane. At the end, Yukina is living with his family as a homestay. Kuwabara is a popular character with fans, coming in fourth place in the series' first two popularity polls. He came in fifth in the American Shonen Jump poll.

Kurama

Fifteen years before the series began, he was badly injured and escaped to the Human World in soul form, where he entered an embryo in a pregnant human woman, becoming  at birth. Within ten or so years his powers would return and his body would become inhuman, at which point he planned to leave. However, Kurama comes to love his now-single human mother, and when she becomes gravely ill he cannot bear to leave her all alone and remains as Shuichi in the Human World. Having teamed up with Hiei and Goki to steal three Underworld treasures, Kurama becomes a target of Yusuke Urameshi. Yusuke saves Kurama's life with both of them giving some of their lifeforces, therefore they both survive (in the anime, the mirror cancels the sacrifice due to Yusuke's kindness). This act bonds Yusuke and Kurama as friends and allies. He begins assisting Yusuke in defeating The Four Beasts in exchange for a reduced sentence.

Hiei

 is introduced as one of three wanted demons, alongside Kurama and Goki, who stole three treasures from the Underworld. As the last of his partners on the run, Hiei kidnaps Keiko in an exchange with Yusuke for the other two treasures. However, he also cuts her with the Conjuring Blade, forcing Yusuke to defeat him to save her, which he does with help from Kurama and Botan. Hiei possesses the  implanted in his forehead, which gives him clairvoyance and allows him to control lesser demons and humans with only a glance. He can transform into a form with Evil Eyes all over his body, boosting his powers. While assisting Yusuke in defeating The Four Beasts in exchange for a reduced sentence, Hiei changes and no longer acts solely for his own interest. For associating with humans, Hiei and Kurama are invited to take part in the Dark Tournament on Yusuke and Kuwabara's team. He eventually masters the technique by consuming the flames, which greatly enhances the user's abilities. Although he initially refrains from helping Yusuke and company stop Sensui from opening the portal to the Demon Plane because he wants to return himself, Hiei later joins them when Yusuke offers to let him have The Black Chapter videotape. After watching Yusuke's death by Sensui, Hiei's old demon powers awaken. He is invited to the Demon Plane to join Mukuro. He takes part in the Demon Plane Unification Tournament, losing to Mukuro in the third round. At the end of the series, he is assigned to the special squad in charge of safely returning humans who wander into the Demon Plane.

Hiei is Yukina's twin brother. It is later revealed that he is a fire demon born to a race of female Ice Maidens, who reproduce by parthenogenesis every 100 years, always giving birth to a female. However, a male child is born only if the Maiden has had sexual contact with a male, which is forbidden in their society. As her children were born, their mother wept two Tears of Ice before dying, tears that crystallize into jewels and are given to the babies. Hiei was thrown from the floating glacial country to his supposed doom, but managed to survive and grew up in the wilderness where he developed a thirst for killing. The only times he found peace were while looking at his Tear of Ice jewel, later deciding to find the glacial country in order to take revenge on the women who cast him out. Having lost his jewel during a battle, Hiei went to Shigure and had an Evil Eye implanted so he could find it and the glacial country, at the cost of losing his powers. Though he easily found the Ice Maidens' home, his lust for revenge fades, he can not find his jewel and sets out to find his sister instead.

Hiei is a popular character with fans, coming in first place in the series' first two popularity polls. He also came in first in the American Shonen Jump poll. He was ranked as the first, then second, then third most popular male anime character in Animages Anime Grand Prix for the consecutive years of 1993, 1994, and 1995. The Japanese publication Newtype ranked him as the fifth best male anime character of the 1990s. Masashi Kishimoto said that he used Hiei as a reference when creating Sasuke Uchiha from Naruto and his Sharingan technique.

Keiko Yukimura

 is Yusuke's childhood friend and classmate and eventually girlfriend. She has known Yusuke for many years and acts as a disciplinary figure, often trying to get him to attend his classes and behave, though usually to no avail. Yusuke attempts to keep his job as spirit detective a secret from Keiko, though she finds out about it. Keiko worries about Yusuke but knows that he is more happy fighting demons than having a normal school life. When Yusuke leaves for the Demon Plane he promises to return and proposes to her. At the end of the series, Keiko is entering college to be a teacher. She came in sixth in the American Shonen Jump poll.

Botan

 is a guide to the Underworld or a shinigami, charged with ferrying souls of the deceased to the Underworld to face their final judgment. She is sent to inform Yusuke on the offer for him to be resurrected, and later acts as his assistant and trainer as he starts out his tenure as Underworld Detective. Botan teaches him how to use the various detective tools, communicates messages from Koenma and often guides him to different destinations pertaining to his cases. She will also join him in the field occasionally and protected Keiko from the crazed humans controlled by the Four Beasts. According to Koenma, Botan's sentimental side sometimes overtakes her professionalism. In the anime, she goes with Yusuke and Kuwabara to Tarukane's mansion and acts as team manager in the Dark Tournament. Botan is a popular character with fans, coming in fifth and sixth place in the series' first two popularity polls. She came in fourth in the American Shonen Jump poll. Botan was ranked as the seventh most popular female anime character in Animages 1993 Anime Grand Prix, the eighth in 1994, and the eleventh in 1995.

Genkai

 is an elderly martial arts expert who is famous among both humans and demons, and considered one of the top five reiki masters according to her friend Koenma. She first appears holding a tournament to find a successor for her techniques, which Yusuke and Kuwabara both take part in. Having entered the tournament as a detective on a case, Yusuke wins after defeating Rando and is taken on as Genkai's student. After winning, the two split as Toguro decided to become a demon, while she wanted to grow old together. When using her full power, Genkai's cells revitalize and her body rejuvenates momentarily, causing her to appear as she did in her prime, around 20 years old. During the semifinals against Team Fractured Fairy Tales, Genkai imparts her strength to Yusuke, leaving her much weaker. Now of no use to him, Toguro kills Genkai the day before the finals. After Team Urameshi wins the tournament, Genkai is brought back to life by Koenma for their reward at Toguro's suggestion. She has Asato Kido, Yu Kaito, and Mitsunari Yanagisawa attack Yusuke and friends as a training lesson and to inform them that someone is opening a portal to the Demon Plane. At Kurama's request, Genkai trains Rinku, Chu, Toya, Jin, Shishiwakamaru and Suzuki to balance power in the Demon Plane. At the end of the series, Genkai decides to leave her vast land to Yusuke and his friends. While Genkai had already died during this moment in the manga, in the anime, she is still alive. Genkai is a popular character with fans, coming in seventh place in the series' second popularity poll. In a 2007 poll by Oricon, Genkai was tied with two other characters as the fifth-best anime "master" with a 6% vote.

Koenma

Koenma takes over the responsibilities of his father's work when he is away. Though he is said to be at least 700 years old, Koenma usually appears as a toddler with a pacifier in his mouth and wearing a large hat with the kanji for "king" and the English letters "Jr". He can also transform into a young adult form, retaining his pacifier but losing his hat, showing the letters "Jr" on his forehead. Koenma acts as Yusuke's boss, assigning him his Underworld Detective cases through Botan. His pacifier is a receptacle, which Koenma constantly imbues with his aura so it can create a powerful barrier in order to fend off a dark age still centuries away. However, after deciding to use it early to stop Sensui, it proves ineffective because of Sensui's Holy Chi. At the end of the series, an investigation by Koenma ended up revealing that his father had been falsifying reports on demon activity against humans in order to justify keeping the two separated. Having proven the criminal statistics are much lower, Koenma is now in charge of the Underworld and allows access between the Demon Plane and Human World. Koenma is a popular character with fans, coming in seventh and fifth place in the series' first two popularity polls. He came in ninth in the American Shonen Jump poll.

Antagonists

Genkai Tournament candidates

Rando

 is a demon of battle who specializes in defeating martial arts masters and monks. Having killed 99 masters so far, he steals their secret techniques and tests them out on humans. Rando participates in Genkai's tournament to select her pupil in order to learn her techniques, and Yusuke is sent to stop him on orders from Koenma. He defeats Kuwabara and is about to beat Yusuke with the same technique, but Rando's ignorance of the stolen techniques causes it to backfire on him and he is defeated by Yusuke and arrested by Botan. Rando is voiced by Yō Inoue in and by Eric Vale in English. Rando came in tenth place in the series' first popularity poll. He also came in tenth in the American Shonen Jump poll.

Kazemaru

 is a ninja who guards VIPs, and eventually decides to compete in Genkai's tournament. Kazemaru wielded a version of the Spirit Gun that was more powerful than Yusuke's own, expelled from his entire palm. He also wields explosive shuriken capable of pursuing their target. Yusuke was still able to defeat him, due in large part to luck.

Kuroda

 is a professional contract killer who was defeated by Kazemaru.

Chinpo

 is a wanderer and a tournament competitor who was defeated by Rando.

Musashi

 is a wandering swordsman who hunts down demons. Musashi has the ability to cloak his spirit energy, allowing him to bypass Kuwabara's high spiritual awareness and remain undetected. He carries around a wooden sword capable of killing demons. Kuwabara defeats him with his newfound Spirit Sword power.

Kibano

 is a self-proclaimed master of all the world's martial arts. He has the power to absorb spirit energy from the environment to increase the size of his muscles. He was defeated by Yusuke's clever thinking.

The Four Beasts
The  are four demons who run a criminal organization in a part of the Demon Plane called , a haven for criminals. In order to get the Underworld to allow them access to the Human World, the Four Beasts release parasitic insects into the human world causing them to send Yusuke to their  to stop them. The Four Beasts share their names with the four symbols of Chinese astrology.

Genbu

 is a rock demon with the power to move through stone as though it were part of his body. Although he can reassemble his shattered body, he is defeated by Kurama.

Byakko

 is an anthropomorphic tiger who can turn pieces of his hair into lesser beasts, absorb aura energy, and fire sonic blasts from his mouth that destroy everything they touch by destroying their molecular bonds. Although he is defeated by Kuwabara, he is killed by Seiryu.

Seiryu

 is a demon with enhanced speed and control over ice. He is quickly cut to pieces by Hiei.

Suzaku

 is the leader of the Four Beasts. A demon who uses lightning to attack, he is able to split himself into seven separate, yet equally powerful bodies. Suzaku came in sixth place in the series' first popularity poll. He came in eighth in the American Shonen Jump poll.

Team Jolly Devil Six
Team  is the first team that Team Urameshi fights in the opening round of the Dark Tournament. The members decided their alternate by rock–paper–scissors.

Rinku

 is a young demon who uses yo-yos to attack. Rinku is childish and playful and often annoys those around him. He is the first fighter on his team to step forward in the ring, fighting Kuwabara. Rinku controls his yo-yos by channeling his aura through the strings, is very acrobatic, and is capable of healing his wounds with his own demon energy. He defeats Kuwabara by ring out, though he is quick to cheer for Team Urameshi after his own team's loss. During the fight for control of the Demon Plane, Rinku is one of the demons that Genkai and Kurama train to fight for Yomi, though they eventually all disband to fight individually in the Demon Plane Unification Tournament. At the end of the series, he is seen with Sasuga, a female demon who defeated him in the tournament and with whom he fell in love.

Roto

, a demon who can form a sickle on top of his hand, is the second member to fight. He has his familiars stalk Kurama's human mother to force him into submission, until the plant Kurama planted in Roto blooms, killing him.

Zeru

 is a demon with control over fire. He is the team leader and his power is far greater than his teammates, with the exception of Chu. Because of this, Hiei quickly beats him by summoning powers he can not yet completely control, leaving his right arm severely injured. The remaining team members run away after Hiei's display of power.

Chu

 is the strongest fighter of Team Jolly Devil Six. Although he is technically the team's alternate fighter due to losing at rock-paper-scissors, he is able to fight after decapitating his fleeing teammates Imajin and Gaou. After exhausting their auras, he and Yusuke agree to a hand-to-hand combat fight with their heels against two knives stuck into the arena floor, which Chu loses after both use headbutts. During the fight for control of the Demon Plane, Chu is one of the demons that Genkai and Kurama train to fight for Yomi, though they eventually all disband to fight individually in the Demon Plane Unification Tournament. At the end of the series, he is training with Natsume, the female demon who defeated him in the tournament and whom he fell in love with.

Imajin and Gaou

Team Ichigaki
Dr. Ichigaki

Team Ichigaki is the second team that Team Urameshi faces in the Dark Tournament. He then implanted the Blood-Slaver Node onto their backs, giving him control of their minds and boosting their fighting abilities. It is revealed that Ichigaki is the one who originally poisoned their master in order to manipulate them. Yusuke, Kuwabara and the Masked Fighter fight these martial artists in a battle royale, while Kurama and Hiei are delayed fighting two lesser members of the team and the robot-like  in the wilderness outside the competition. Due to their refined auras, the three martial artists' attacks are invisible to the weaker Yusuke and Kuwabara. After Team Ichigaki knocks Kuwabara down for a ten count, the Masked Fighter destroys the Blood-Slaver Nodes on all three, knocking all three down for a simultaneous ten count and winning the round for Team Urameshi. The martial artists survive and, free of Ichigaki's control, reunite with their master who was healed by Kurama.

Team Shadow Channelers
Team  is the third team that Team Urameshi faces in the Dark Tournament. They are a group of renowned ninja demons who are hoping to win the tournament so they can claim the hosting island as their home. Team Urameshi fights Team Shadow Channelers immediately after Team Ichigaki and, under the guise of a medical exam, Hiei and the Masked Fighter are forced to sit out by Luka.

Gama

, a "Master of Ritual Adornment", is the first member to fight, doing so through ritual body art that he paints using his blood. In addition to painting himself to boost his power, he also paints designs on his opponents to seal their movements. Before dying from Kurama's attack, Gama paints a design on him that binds Kurama's demonic aura for another ten minutes in order to aid his team.

Toya

, the "Hexed Ice Master", is the second member of Team Shadow Channelers to fight. He battles Kurama, whose demonic aura was sealed in the previous match by Gama, using sharp ice projectiles and an ice sword that is attached to his hand. However, he is defeated when Kurama plants his attack into his own wounds to access his aura and knock Toya down for a ten count. During the fight for control of the Demon Plane, Toya is one of the demons that Genkai and Kurama train to fight for Yomi, though they eventually all disband to fight individually in the Demon Plane Unification Tournament.

Bakuken

, the third member to fight, is a demon who can create a thick fog from his sweat and beats an unconscious Kurama until winning the match via ring out at the orders of Risho. The weakest member of Team Shadow Channelers, Yusuke quickly defeats him.

Jin

, the "Wind Master", is the fourth member of Team Shadow Channelers to fight. He has the ability to fly at great speeds and to block and change the course of any energy-based attacks that travel through the air. His signature move is to spin his forearm at high speed, creating a tornado around it, making his punches more powerful, even causing damage when he misses. Jin enjoys his battles, especially when he has a worthy opponent. Although his fight with Yusuke is initially ruled a loss for Jin via ring out, the decision is overturned and declared a draw. He and Yusuke have a lot in common, and it is apparent that both enjoyed their fight. During the fight for control of the Demon Plane, Jin is one of the demons that Genkai and Kurama train to fight for Yomi, though they eventually all disband to fight individually in the Demon Plane Unification Tournament.

Risho

 is a demon with power over earth, using it to form armor made of clay. Despite unfair interference by the Tournament organizers throughout the entire round, Kuwabara defeats Risho for the final win thanks to a revitalization after Yukina appears.

Team Fractured Fairy Tales
Team  fights Team Urameshi in the semifinals of the Dark Tournament. Composed of fighters gathered together by Suzuki, who furnished them with weapons he created, their names, appearances and powers are derived from myths in Japanese folklore. The matches are decided by rolling dice, with Hiei initially filling in for both Yusuke and the Masked Fighter (Genkai), while the latter gives Yusuke the final test as her student.

Evil Kintaro
, a parody of Kintarō, is a demon who can turn his hand into an ax. Hiei quickly kills him with his swordsmanship.

Poison Peach Boy
, a parody of Momotarō, is a demon who can make himself impervious to any attack his body has experienced by absorbing his Millet Dumplings. These dumplings also transform his body, giving it simian, avian, or canine characteristics, but he is killed by Hiei.

Reverse Urashima
, a parody of Urashima Tarō, wields a fishing pole as a weapon and the Reverse Magic Box ("Idun Box" in the English anime) against Kurama. The box of smoke makes anyone who breathes it reverse in age. However, it inadvertently turns Kurama into his original, more powerful fox demon form, before he entered a human embryo. Terrified, Reverse Urashima begs for his life and begins to reveal his team's secrets, before being killed by Shishiwakamaru revealing he was a weak Illusion Beast.

Shishiwakamaru

, a parody of Minamoto no Yoshitsune who was known as 'Ushiwakamaru' in his childhood, is a swordsman who seeks to make himself famous. He quickly wins his first match against Kuwabara by teleporting him to the old Dark Tournament arena. He then faces the recently reappeared Masked Fighter (Genkai), who is now much weaker, having given Yusuke her aura. During the fight for control of the Demon Plane, Shishiwakamaru is one of the demons that Genkai and Kurama train to fight for Yomi, though they eventually all disband to fight individually in the Demon Plane Unification Tournament.

Suzuki

 excels at creating weapons for others, as well as controlling his aura harmonics, enabling him to create varied and colorful attacks. After revealing his own clown appearance, Suzuki reveals and states that he used the disguise to help him fight harder, dressed as what he hates. Extremely vain, he refers to himself as Suzuki "the Beautiful," and wants to become famous before he starts to show age. He quickly wins his first match against Kuwabara by teleporting him to the old Dark Tournament arena, just like Shishiwakamaru did. However, Genkai then easily defeats Suzuki using only physical attacks. Suzuki later gives the Sword of Trials to Kuwabara and the Seed of De-Incarnation to Kurama, which he had previously given to Shishiwakamaru and Reverse Urashima respectively, to aid them against Team Toguro. In the past Suzuki fought Younger Toguro but was spared after begging for his life. He then trained and vowed to defeat Toguro in the Dark Tournament, not for revenge, but to prove to Toguro that power is not everything, but now realizes it will not be done by him. During the fight for control of the Demon Plane, Suzuki is one of the demons that Genkai and Kurama train to fight for Yomi, though they eventually all disband to fight individually in the Demon Plane Unification Tournament.

Team Toguro
Team Toguro are the fifth and final team that Team Urameshi faces in the Dark Tournament. They are the winners of the previous tournament. Younger Toguro fights the preliminary round alone, while his three teammates sweep the semifinal round. Togashi considers the Toguro Brothers to be his favorite villains in the series because they are "fundamentally unrestrained." The Toguro Brothers came in eleventh place in the series' first popularity poll. In the second, Younger Toguro placed tenth and Elder Toguro eleventh. The brothers came in seventh in the American Shonen Jump poll.

Younger Toguro

However, it is revealed that their actual client was Sakyo, who is also their team sponsor in the Dark Tournament. Younger Toguro is a human turned demon and the main antagonist during the Dark Tournament arc. His ability is purely physical strength, able to regulate how much of his maximum power he releases, ranging from 0% to 100%. With each increase comes a burst of demon energy and his muscles thicken and enlarge themselves. At full power he needs to feed on aura to maintain such immense power, leading him to absorb the aura of weaker creatures. Once a great martial arts master and Genkai's lover, Toguro was psychologically scarred when a demon named Kairen killed all of his students while inviting him to participate in the Dark Tournament. Toguro defeated Kairen in the final round to win the tournament and decided he did not want to age and lose his power, therefore he asked to be turned into a demon. 50 years later he invites Yusuke to the tournament in hopes of finally finding a fighter worthy of his full 100% power. Although he stops Yusuke's final attack in the final round, Toguro's body is destroyed and he dies. In the afterlife, he is offered a lighter sentence by Koenma due to his time as a martial artist, but Toguro refuses and requests the harshest sentence there is: 10,000 years of torture in hell for 10,000 cycles, with his soul ceasing to exist afterward. In the English anime dub this is changed to him requesting limbo. Feeling it obvious what Team Urameshi would wish for as their prize for winning the tournament, it was Toguro who suggested Koenma resurrect Genkai.

Elder Toguro

 is first introduced alongside his younger brother as Brokers of Darkness, demons who provide monsters for things such as sideshows or assault forces, hired by Tarukane to make Yukina cry. However, it is revealed that their actual client was Sakyo, who is also their team sponsor in the Dark Tournament. Elder Toguro is a human turned demon shapeshifter. He usually rides on his much larger brother's shoulder and often fights alongside him. Elder Toguro can alter the shape of his body to form weapons and shields or to move his organs to escape harm, and has regenerative abilities, almost to the point of immortality. In the second to last match of the Dark Tournament, Kuwabara works around his regeneration by squashing him with the Aura Sword (whose shape had been manipulated into that of a flyswatter), and Elder Toguro is declared the loser. But Elder Toguro reveals he is still alive as his brother is about to begin his fight against Yusuke and offers to be his weapon. However, Younger Toguro punches him to pieces and off the island, saying that the fight will be one-on-one only. After being nearly destroyed by his brother, Elder Toguro slowly regenerated until he was a head found by Sensui. Seeking revenge he informed Sensui about Yusuke, who decided it was time to begin his plan to destroy humanity. Toguro was later devoured by Sadao Makihara, but Toguro easily took control of his body and acquired Makihara's abilities as well as those of Makihara's past victims. In his fight with Kurama, Makihara/Toguro is captured in a parasitic tree that casts illusions, and because of Toguro's immortality, he is stuck fighting Kurama's ghost for eternity.

Karasu

 is a master-class demon bomber. Like Bui, Karasu fought against the Toguro brothers and lost and subsequently became a member of Team Toguro. He is able to use his aura to create and control bombs undetectable by weaker demons. Karasu displays sadistic tendencies, stating that he favors Kurama and becomes depressed when he destroys what he likes, but enjoys being depressed and therefore is looking forward to killing him. He wears a mask over his mouth which seems to restrict his powers. He is also able to use his entire body as an explosive. Karasu fights Kurama in the opening match of the final round of the Dark Tournament. Due to letting his guard down, Karasu is killed by Kurama, whose fox demon powers have started to return to his human body. But because Kurama did not get up until after a ten count, Karasu is ruled the winner.  Karasu is a popular character with fans, coming in eighth place in the series' second popularity poll.

Bui

 is a demon warrior who possesses an immense battle aura, that even allows him to levitate. He wears heavy armor to suppress his aura and wields an ax larger than his own body. During the third match of the final round of the Dark Tournament, Bui faces Hiei and loses as the latter has mastered the Black Dragon Hellfire. When he was younger, Bui fought Younger Toguro and lost. With the prospect of a rematch, he trained and improved, but so did Toguro. Having lost to Hiei, it proves he will never beat Toguro, and so Bui asks Hiei to kill him, which Hiei refuses.

Sakyo

After winning all bets and bankrupting Tarukane, it is revealed that Sakyo actually hired the Toguro brothers and had them throw the fight and that Tarukane originally stole Yukina from Sakyo. Sakyo is the sponsor of Team Toguro in the Dark Tournament. He is a sociopath, who grew up torturing and killing animals and people. He has an affinity and knack for gambling, occasionally putting his own life on the line just for the thrill of it. With his expected monetary winnings from the tournament, Sakyo plans to create a large hole or portal linking the Demon Plane with the Human World, for no reason other than to see what happens. After Younger Toguro's death and having staked his own life on the victory, Sakyo self-destructs the tournament arena and is crushed to death. In the anime, he forms a romantic bond with Shizuru Kuwabara.

Sensui Seven
The  are a group who are trying to open a portal linking the Human World with the Demon Plane. Led by Shinobu Sensui, it is composed of seven individuals referred to by nicknames which are also the names of their abilities. Sensui used The Black Chapter, a videotape that documents thousands of hours of humanity's atrocities, to recruit the human members in his goal to eradicate humanity for being evil.

Shinobu Sensui

Born with a powerful sixth sense, Sensui was a prodigy aura user and demon hunter from an early age. He was recruited as Underworld Detective and worked tirelessly as an advocate for justice, believing demons to be humanity's enemy. During a case to stop a small Demon Plane portal created by the Black Book Club, including Sakyo, Sensui found a room where humans were torturing demons and bathing in their blood. After Sensui saw the cruelty of humans, in antithesis of what he believed, he went mad and murdered everyone in the room. He began to question humanity itself and soon disappeared taking The Black Chapter with him. Sensui waited ten years for a new Underworld Detective to emerge before coming out of hiding and enacting his plan to judge the human race. During his years in hiding, Sensui created six alternate personalities (seven including himself) to deal with the pressures of battle; Shinobu is the original and central one, while three others deal with matters of combat. Sensui also wields , a special type of aura that is said to be the purest of all. After Sensui takes a fatal blow when Yusuke's demon ancestor takes over Yusuke's body briefly, it is revealed that he suffered from aggressive malignant tumors with only two weeks left to live. Before dying, Sensui states that he longed to have demon heritage, that he created the portal so that he could die in the Demon Plane, and wishes that he be reincarnated as a demon.

Itsuki/ Gatekeeper

They were enemies when they first met and Itsuki lost the fight, but Sensui spared him after seeing a glimpse of his human side. He anticipated Sensui's madness before it began, based on the quality of his pure soul, and looked forward to watching him sink into despair at the horrors he was unable to rationalize. He is the one who creates the portal to the Demon Plane. Itsuki has the Inverse Man transport Kuwabara, Kurama, and Hiei to hyperspace in order to watch Yusuke's fight with Sensui without interference or escape. After Sensui's death, Itsuki informs Koenma that he can not have Sensui's soul as he did not want to go to the Underworld and takes the body into another dimension. Itsuki is one of Togashi's favorite characters. After the series ended, Togashi stated that he wishes he had been able to expand on the character's twisted psyche. He also noted the portion of the plot where Itsuki speaks inside the Inverse Man to be his favorite of the series because it reflects how the manga artist was feeling at the time.

Minoru Kamiya/ Doctor

His Doctor ability allows him to use his hands like scalpels, reattach limbs and create and infect people within his territory with an aura virus. Kamiya also enhanced his physical abilities and can control the adrenaline so he does not feel pain. He knows that finishing the portal to the Demon Plane will mean the destruction of the Human World and himself but believes that death by a demon is a fitting end for him over disease or old age. Kamiya is killed by Yusuke, saving those infected by his virus, but quickly revived by Genkai and then arrested. At the end of the arc, Kamiya escapes from jail, resuscitates Hagiri, and reconstructs his own face to evade police. He later dubbed his ability "psychic healing" and founded the dojo of the Miracle Hand.

Kaname Hagiri/ Sniper

His ability Deathprint bullseyes allows him to "shoot" any object infused with his aura at his enemy. After marking his enemy with targets, these objects will zero in on them without fail. While trying to stop Yusuke from following Sensui and company, Hagiri is seemingly killed by Hiei. But it is later revealed that Hiei was very precise not to kill him and he was healed by Kamiya. He is last seen alongside his sister, who has an ability akin to psychometry, and sets out after a group of bullies who killed a kitten after being shown these events by his sister. He later disappeared after high school.

Kiyoshi Mitarai/ Seaman

His ability Seaman allows him to mix his blood with liquids to create shape-shifting nearly invulnerable creatures made of water. His territory is contained within these creatures that he traps people in to drown. Mitarai is psychologically scarred after watching the Black Chapter videotape and believes that all humans, including himself, are inherently evil and should be wiped out. He attacks Kuwabara and his friends, but is defeated when Kuwabara's regains his aura and acquires the new ability to summon the Dimensional Sword. Sensui knew Mitarai was weak and uncertain and therefore had him bugged with a listening device and tries to kill him alongside Hagiri in Yusuke's apartment. Having been saved by Kuwabara twice and then Botan, Mitarai rethinks his stance on humans and decides to help in the fight against Sensui. After the final fight, he lives a normal life, and gets into his school of choice. He later devotes his time to environmental and international issues. He is voiced by Rika Matsumoto in Japanese and by Justin Pate in English.

Tsukihito Amanuma/ Game Master

His ability Game Master is able to bring video games to reality, creating them within his territory. To stall Yusuke and company for as long as possible, he recreates a specific game at Sensui's request that requires seven players and can be replayed until it is won, taking on the role of its main character/antagonist. However, Kurama informs Amanuma that Sensui took advantage of the child and chose a game where the antagonist dies if beaten, causing Amanuma to die as well. Shaken, Amanuma loses the final match and Kurama wins, killing the boy. However, Amanuma is brought back to life by Koenma's pacifier, just as Sensui intended for him to waste the power. He later lives a normal life and even makes new friends his age.

Sadao Makihara/ Gourmet

His ability Gourmet allows him to eat other beings and gain their powers as his own. At some point he devoured Shigeru Murota and the regenerating head of Elder Toguro, but the immortal demon ends up taking over Makihara's body. Thus he is able to absorb abilities, read minds, and regenerate. Kurama captures Makihara/Toguro in a parasitic tree that casts illusions and because of Toguro's immortality and evil nature, he is stuck fighting Kurama's illusion for eternity.

Demon Plane

Yomi

 is the newest of the three demon kings vying for control of the Demon Plane. He was Kurama's second in command as bandits working to build a nation. Yomi was reckless and brash, and Kurama sent an assassin who blinded him before fleeing. Kurama then left for the Human World and Mukuro and Raizen rose to power. Having equaled them in power and with Raizen dying, Yomi plans to take over both the Demon Plane and Human World. He calls Kurama to aid him and threatens his human family to get him to stay. After Yusuke proposes the Demon Plane Unification Tournament, Yomi is forced to accept and announce the dissolution of his nation. However, this is initially a bluff, until his fighting spirit is roused and he abandons his plans. In the tournament he defeats his young son  and Yusuke, before losing to someone else.

Mukuro

 is one of the three demon kings vying for control of the Demon Plane. She recruits Hiei, who becomes her top warrior. She was born into slavery under a humanoid demon named Chiko, who continuously tormented her, particularly on her birthday, with the implication of sexual abuse. After pouring acid on herself at seven years old, Chiko lost interest and Mukuro was free. She killed indiscriminately, before finding Hiei's lost Tear of Ice jewel, which had the same calming effect on her as it does him. Despite missing half her body, Mukuro rose to prominence equal to Raizen. She is quick to accept Yusuke's proposal of the Demon Plane Unification Tournament, dissolving her nation. In the tournament she defeats Hiei, before losing to someone else. At the end of the series, Hiei learns that Chiko implanted a single memory of himself being kind into Mukuro's mind, which she remembered every time she thought of getting revenge. He also trapped him in a parasitic plant which he gives to her on her birthday. In the anime, Mukuro's backstory is changed to exclude the parts about her being a sex slave, and that she was simply an abandoned child found by Chiko and taken in for slavery. Togashi has stated that Mukuro is one of his favorite characters. The author had desired to write more about her abuse before the series ended.

Raizen

 is one of the three demon kings vying for control of the Demon Plane and Yusuke's ancestral father. Nearly 700 years ago, Raizen, then in the Human World, fell in love with a human woman. She was a "cannibal healer," a shaman who ate the flesh of the diseased to create antidotes to the disease with their blood, who taunted him that if he consumed her he would be killed from her poisonous body. Raizen immediately falls in love with her, they mate that night and he vows to himself to never eat human flesh until they meet again. However, they never did as she died giving birth. Raizen summons Yusuke to the Demon Plane as he is on the brink of death from starvation and requires someone to take his throne. During Yusuke's fight with Sensui, he momentarily takes over his body to defeat Sensui. He later dies, making Yusuke king of his domain.

Shigure

 is a demon osteopath and one of Mukuro's top warriors. He is the one who gave Hiei his Evil Eye, so that he could find the Ice Maiden's country and his Tear of Ice jewel, and taught him basic swordsmanship. Shigure only operates on patients that interest him and takes part of their "life existence" as payment, which in Hiei's case was that he could never reveal his relation to Yukina. Shigure fights Hiei as part of Mukuro's testing of whether Hiei can qualify to be the right-hand man. He wields the large  that looks like a large hula hoop. In the quick battle, they both lose an arm, but Shigure also loses the top half of his head. However, Shigure then appears fully healed in the Demon Plane Unification Tournament as an opponent of Kurama, whom he loses to, and is later seen doing patrol work with Hiei at the end of the series. In the anime, after losing to Kurama, he apparently commits suicide, stating that a swordsman never loses twice.

Shu

 is an Upper S-Class demon and a former friend of Raizen. After Raizen's death, he allied with Yusuke and participated in the Makai Tournament.

Other characters

Atsuko Urameshi

 is Yusuke's 29-year-old mother. She is an alcoholic and neglectful mother, whose only known means of making money is by extorting police and yakuza. While she plays a larger supporting role in the manga, she only appears early on in the anime and the later 2018 All or Nothing OVA special. At the end of the series she is seen with an ex-boyfriend who works for her, who tries to get back together with her, and who mentions how Yusuke used to jump on him when he hit her, implying it is his father.

Shizuru Kuwabara

 is Kazuma's seventeen-year-old sister. She is an aspiring beautician and has a sixth sense even stronger than her brother's. It is Shizuru who recommends her brother see master Genkai for advice on the side effects of his sixth sense, getting him caught up in her tournament to find a pupil. Considerably down to earth and deadpan in most scenes, her role is mainly to act as the tough mother-figure to Kuwabara. Her role grows somewhat during the Dark Tournament, and appears again at the end of the series. However, in the anime she has a brief romantic connection to Sakyo as he saves her numerous times from demon guards at the stadium, and is given his lighter to remember him by as he dies in the stadium's destruction and takes over the role that Yusuke's mother had in the Sensui arc of the manga. Yoshihiro Togashi named Shizuru his favorite female character of the series "because she keeps her cool."

Yukina

As a member of a demonic family of winter spirits, she produces beautiful jewels through her tears. When she found out about her brother who was cast from the Ice Kingdom she escaped to the Human World. For the last five years Yukina has been held captive by Gonzo Tarukane, a member of the Black Book Club, who has become very wealthy through the jewels he forces her to make. Eventually she hardens her heart so as to prevent herself from crying even under extreme torture, prompting Tarukane to hire the Toguro brothers to aid him. As an Underworld Detective mission, Yusuke and Kuwabara succeed in rescuing Yukina from Tarukane's mansion. Yukina returns attending the Dark Tournament to ask Kuwabara (who has a crush on her) and his friends for help finding her brother, and to offer her healing powers. At the end of the series, Yukina is living with Kuwabara's family as a homestay.

Asato Kido

 is a fifteen-year-old human who, along with Yu Kaito and Mitsunari Yanagisawa, kidnaps Yusuke and takes him to the Fourth Dimensional Mansion. They developed superhuman powers as a result of the Demon Plane portal opened by Sensui and Itsuki and sought the aid of Genkai, who has them attack Yusuke, Kuwabara, Kurama and Hiei. It is shown that he also has some control over his own shadow, using it to spell out his attackers name after he is paralyzed by Kamiya.

Yu Kaito

 is a seventeen-year-old human who, along with Kido and Yanagisawa, kidnaps Yusuke and takes him to the Fourth Dimensional Mansion. Having written several published philosophical papers and books of literary criticism, he is the smartest student at Meio High School, behind only Kurama. Kido, Yanagisawa and himself developed superhuman powers as a result of the Demon Plane portal opened by Sensui and Itsuki and sought the aid of Genkai, who has them attack Yusuke, Kuwabara, Kurama and Hiei. Although he succeeds in capturing the souls of Hiei, Kurama and Botan, he is outplayed by Kurama. His last appearance shows him spending his weekend playing video games and writing.

Mitsunari Yanagisawa

 is a sixteen-year-old human who, along with Kido and Kaito, kidnaps Yusuke and takes him to the Fourth Dimensional Mansion. They developed superhuman powers as a result of the Demon Plane portal opened by Sensui and Itsuki and sought the aid of Genkai, who has them attack Yusuke, Kuwabara, Kurama and Hiei. In his last appearance, he is thinking about using his ability on an attractive girl to learn everything about her, and it is revealed that ten years later, he marries the other girl who tries to cheer him up.

Pu

To return to life Koenma gives Yusuke a Spirit Beast egg. As Yusuke traveled with Botan as a ghost it would feed off of his aura and hatch in a creature whose form and demeanor would depend on how pure Yusuke's actions were. After using all the energy he had accumulated to save Keiko from a fire, Yusuke was returned to his body through an alternate method, while the egg was stored in the Underworld by Koenma. During the semifinals of the Dark Tournament the egg hatches into Pu, a small penguin-like animal with large floppy ears used to fly, a beak and black hair on his head. Yusuke is embarrassed to get such a cute spirit beast but is endeared to Pu after it helps him during Genkai's final discipleship test. After Yusuke is killed by Sensui and revives as a demon, Pu changes into a large bird, resembling a phoenix. Pu came in ninth place in the series' second popularity poll.

Jorge Saotome

, also spelled "George" in the Anime Works English dub of the first film, is an ogre and one of Koenma's underlings that only appears in the anime. Koenma often blames him for any problems that may occur, most often problems that Koenma causes himself. While Jorge attempts to act as the voice of reason most of the time, he rarely gets praised for it. In the second to last episode it is revealed that the anime series was an underworld file on Yusuke Urameshi with Jorge as the narrator. He then goes back to hating his job as Koenma's aide.

Koto, Juri and Luka

Koto

, who resembles a fox or cat, is the initial referee/announcer for the Dark Tournament. She takes the rules of the tournament seriously, and even mildly protests the tournament committee's underhanded manipulations.

Juri

In the semifinals, who resembles an amphibian, takes over as referee while Koto gives the play-by-play commentary.

Luka

 is a demon who specializes in force fields and is the nurse at the Dark Tournament. At the direction of the tournament organizers, she keeps Hiei and the Masked Fighter from competing in Team Urameshi's round against Team Shadow Channelers under the false guise of them being medically unfit. At the end of the series, all three become widely popular idols on human television together under the name the "Occult Threesome".

Kirishima, Okubo and Sawamura
Kirishima

Okubo

Sawamura

Okubo's single mother, often ill, does not bring enough money into her household, so Okubo holds a job in order to support the household. All three appear in the Sensui arc where they attend a Megallica concert with Kuwabara. On their way home, they are attacked by Kiyoshi Mitarai and nearly drown in one of his water-based creatures, but are saved by Kuwabara. Afterwards, Kuwabara carries the three, along with Mitarai to Yusuke's apartment before passing out. After Kirishima, Okubo and Sawamura tell Kurama and the others about what happened, their memories are erased. Kirishima came in ninth place in the series' first popularity poll. He came in eleventh in the American Shonen Jump poll.

Shigeru Murota

 is a human whose ability , allows him to read people's minds. He can hear the thoughts of anyone within his range, and the more emotional, the louder he hears them. Murota plans to use this power to be a professional boxer by anticipating attacks so he can easily avoid them. He is confronted by Yusuke and friends while looking for the person responsible for the Demon Plane portal. After being easily defeated by Yusuke, Murota helps them identify Sensui as the mastermind in a crowd via Wiretap. He is then injured by Hagiri and taken to the hospital where Kamiya is and is infected by one of Kamiya's virus insects. It is later revealed that Murota was consumed by Gourmet.

References

YuYu Hakusho manga
Entire series
Togashi, Yoshihiro.  [YuYu Hakusho] (in Japanese). 19 vols. Tokyo: Shueisha, 1991–1994.
Togashi, Yoshihiro. YuYu Hakusho. 19 vols. San Francisco: Viz Media, 2003–2010.

Individual volumes

Other sources 

YuYu Hakusho
Lists of anime and manga characters